The Norfolk County Council election took place on 5 May 2005, coinciding with local elections for all county councils in England and the 2005 general election. It was the first election to be held under new boundaries.

The Conservatives were re-elected with a slightly smaller majority of 8 seats and the Liberal Democrats surpassed Labour in vote share (though not in seats). The Green Party won their first seats on the County Council, both in Norwich.

Other parties and independent candidates stood without winning seats and making little impact.

Summary of results

|-bgcolor=#F6F6F6
| colspan=2 style="text-align: right; margin-right: 1em" | Total
| style="text-align: right;" | 84
| colspan=5 |
| style="text-align: right;" | 402,562
| style="text-align: right;" | 
|-

Election of Group Leaders

Alison King (Humbleyard) was re-elected leader of the Conservative Group, Irene Macdonald (King's Lynn North and Central) became leader of the Labour Group and Barbara Hacker (Thorpe Hamlet) was elected leader of the Liberal Democratic Group.

Barbara Hacker would retire as leader in May 2007 to be replaced by deputy Paul Morse (North Walsham East).

Macdonald would be replaced by Susan Whitaker (Lakenham) before the next election.

Election of Leader of the Council

Alison King (Humbleyard) the leader of the Conservative group was duly re-elected leader of the council and formed a Conservative administration.

King would stand down in March 2006 and was replaced by Shaun Murphy (Wroxham), who would retire after only a year in the job.

Daniel Cox (Wymondham) would replace him.

Results by District

Breckland

Broadland

Great Yarmouth

King's Lynn and West Norfolk

North Norfolk

Norwich

South Norfolk

References

2005 English local elections
2005
2000s in Norfolk